Margarita Cruz Sipuach is a Mexican potter from Guachochi, Chihuahua. She learned pottery from her mother, Filomena Sipuachi. Today, she creates various kinds of utilitarian and ceremonial wares, but her specialty is a type of pot called “tesgüineras.” In 2001, she was named a “grand master” by the Fomento Cultural Banamex .

References

Mexican potters
Mexican women ceramists
Artists from Chihuahua (state)
Living people
Year of birth missing (living people)
Women potters